Gaylord Larsen (born January 4, 1932) is an American crime writer.

He is well known for his fictional murder mystery Dorothy and Agatha, incorporating the well-known mystery novelists Dorothy L. Sayers and Agatha Christie as title characters, where Sayers must solve a crime when a man is murdered in her dining room.

Larsen was born in Canova, South Dakota, and educated at Sioux Falls College (B.A. 1953) and the University of California, Los Angeles (M.A. 1959). During the 1960s, he worked in the television and advertising industries in Los Angeles. In addition to his crime novels, Larsen is also a former writer for the Christian television anthology series This Is the Life. His literary influences include Raymond Chandler, Dorothy L. Sayers, and Ross Macdonald.<ref>"Gaylord Larsen". In Contemporary Authors Online. Gale. 2002.</ref>

He is also the author of the Jason Bradley Mystery Series, as well as:

 1981 The Kilbourne Connection 1983 Trouble Crossing the Pyrenees issued 1986 as An Educated Death 1987 One Hundred Eighty Degrees Murder 1988 A Paramount Kill set in Hollywood with Raymond Chandler as detective.
 1989 Atascadro Island 1990 Dorothy and Agatha''

References

American mystery writers
American male screenwriters
University of Sioux Falls alumni
University of California, Los Angeles alumni
1932 births
People from Miner County, South Dakota
Living people
American male novelists
American male television writers
American television writers
Screenwriters from California
Screenwriters from South Dakota